Ansarud (also Romanized as ‘Anşarūd, Onsorood, and ‘Onşorūd; also known as Astāra, Āstārī, and A’stārī) is a village in Sahand Rural District, in the Central District of Osku County, East Azerbaijan Province, Iran. At the 2006 census, its population was 1,378, in 337 families.

References 

Populated places in Osku County